Earl Verdelle Young (born February 14, 1941) is a retired American sprinter. He competed at the 1960 Olympics and won a gold medal in the 4 × 400 m relay setting a new world record at 3.02.2. He finished sixth in 400 m, in a time of 45.9 s that matched the former Olympic Record. At the 1963 Pan American Games, Young won gold medals in both 4 × 100 m and 4 × 400 m relays.

He was Inducted into the Texas Track and Field Coaches Hall of Fame, Class of 2015.

References

External links

. Sports Illustrated.
Biography. Black Star 231. Retrieved June 3, 2016.
Obituary of Oliver Jackson, Young's coach. Texas Sports Hall of Fame. Retrieved June 3, 2016.

1941 births
Living people
Abilene Christian University alumni
American male sprinters
Athletes (track and field) at the 1960 Summer Olympics
Olympic gold medalists for the United States in track and field
Medalists at the 1960 Summer Olympics
Pan American Games gold medalists for the United States
Athletes (track and field) at the 1963 Pan American Games
Pan American Games medalists in athletics (track and field)
Medalists at the 1963 Pan American Games